On the Reeperbahn at Half Past Midnight is a 1969 West German drama film directed by Rolf Olsen and Al Adamson and starring Curd Jürgens, Heinz Reincke, and Jutta D'Arcy. It takes its title from a popular 1912 song of the same name about Hamburg, the setting of the film. It is also known by the alternative title Shock Treatment.

The film is a remake of On the Reeperbahn at Half Past Midnight (1954).

Main cast

References

Bibliography

External links 
 

1969 films
1969 crime drama films
German crime drama films
West German films
1960s German-language films
Films directed by Rolf Olsen
Films set in Hamburg
Remakes of German films
1960s German films